NMCA may refer to:

  National Mapping and Cadastral Agency, an organisation that produces topographic maps and geographic information of a country 
 National Marine Conservation Areas, marine areas in Canada
 National Michael Chekhov Association, a dancing association; see 
 National Muscle Car Association, a car association; see 
 National Museum of Ceramic Art, a former museum in Maryland
 National Museum of Commercial Aviation, a former museum in the U.S. state of Georgia
 Nikolaev military-civilian administration